A sombrero is a type of wide-brimmed hat.

Sombrero may also refer to:

Sombrero Key (reef), a coral reef in the Florida Keys National Marine Sanctuary
Sombrero, Anguilla, a British overseas island in the Lesser Antilles
Sombrero Galaxy, a spiral galaxy in the constellation Virgo
Sombrero (film), a 1953 film starring Ricardo Montalbán, Pier Angeli, Vittorio Gassman and Cyd Charisse
Sombrero Festival, an annual celebration held jointly by Matamoros, Tamaulipas, Mexico, and Brownsville, Texas, United States

See also
Sombrero function, in mathematics
 Operation Sombrero of the film Delta Farce (2007)